The Grid was a weekly newspaper in Toronto, Ontario, Canada, published from 2011 to 2014. The paper was launched on May 12, 2011, after owner Torstar discontinued publication of its previous title Eye Weekly.

According to editor Laas Turnbull, the publication's strategy was to be a "younger, hipper, more provocative version of Toronto Life in a weekly guise". Print circulation was as high as 70,000 per week, while website hits averaged 400,000 unique visitors per month.

Contributors to the new publication included several former Eye Weekly writers. As of July 2014 there were 22 staff, of whom 12 worked in editorial capacities.

On July 2, 2014, Torstar announced that The Grid would be discontinued as of July 3, due to insufficient revenues. 162 issues were printed in all.

See also
 Dose (magazine)
List of newspapers in Canada

References

Alternative weekly newspapers published in Canada
Torstar publications
Newspapers published in Toronto
Publications established in 2011
Weekly newspapers published in Ontario
Publications disestablished in 2014
Defunct newspapers published in Ontario
2011 establishments in Ontario
2014 disestablishments in Ontario
Defunct weekly newspapers